Kojo-Keleng (also Кызыл-Тала Kyzyl-Tala) is a mountain village in Osh Region of Kyrgyzstan. It is part of the Kara-Suu District. It lies in the valley of the river Jiptiksuu, a tributary of the Ak-Buura. Its population was in 2,224 in 2021.

References 

Populated places in Osh Region